Leslie Charles Turner (6 March 1891 – 2 October 1971) was an Australian rules footballer who played with South Melbourne in the Victorian Football League (VFL).

Family
The son of Albert Turner (1865-1928), and Emmeline Turner, née McGill, Leslie Charles Turner was born at South Melbourne on 6 March 1891.

He married Jean Tayne (1892-1974) in 1921.

Football
He played football for Essendon and Prahran in the VFA, and South Melbourne in the VFL. In 1921 he was captain of the Leopold Football Club.

Military service
He served overseas with the First AIF.

Death
He died at Brunswick, Victoria on 2 October 1971.

See also
 1916 Pioneer Exhibition Game

Notes

References
 
 First World War Embarkation Roll: Company Quartermaster Sergeant Leslie Charles Turner (10), collection of the Australian War Memorial.
 First World War Service Record: Company Quartermaster Sergeant Leslie Charles Turner (10), National Archives of Australia.
 Sporting Echoes, The Essendon Gazette and Keilor, Bulla and Broadmeadows Reporter, (Thursday, 8 April 1915), p.5.
 Q.M.-Sgt. Les Turner, The Winner, (Wednesday, 29 August 1917), p.8.
 Quartermaster Sergeant Les Turner, The (Emerald Hill) Record, (Saturday, 15 September 1917), p.2.
 Brevities, The (Emerald Hill) Record, (Saturday, 10 January 1920), p.3.
 'Kickero', "Footballers Look Forward to a Brisk and Busy Season: South Melbourne, The (Melbourne) Herald, (Friday, 16 April 1920), p.3.
 'Wingster', "Football", The (Emerald Hill) Record, (Saturday, 17 April 1920), p.3.

External links 
 
 
 Leslie G. (sic) Turner, at The VFA Project.
 "Turner, _Pra14", at The VFA Project.

1891 births
1971 deaths
Australian rules footballers from Victoria (Australia)
Sydney Swans players
Essendon Association Football Club players
Prahran Football Club players